Tilhalit, also spelled Tell Khalid and officially recognized as Asmacık, is a village in the Oğuzeli District, Gaziantep Province, Turkey. It was a fortress during the 12th century, contested at times by the Crusaders, Zengids and Ayyubids. 

The village is inhabited by Abdals of the Kurular tribe.

History
On 29 November 1114, an earthquake devastated Tell Khalid, along with numerous other places across the region of Aleppo. It was also damaged in the 1138 Aleppo earthquake. In the autumn or winter of 1150, it was captured by the Zengid ruler Nur ad-Din from the County of Edessa, a Crusader state, which was entirely conquered by the Zengids and other Muslim powers by July 1151. On 17 May 1183, Saladin, a former emir of Nur ad-Din, turned Ayyubid sultan, captured Tell Bashir as part of his general movement to capture Aleppo, which he besieged four days later, from the Zengids. Saladin's brother, Buri, had already been besieging Tell Khalid, but its town and fortress surrendered without fighting upon Saladin's arrival there. It was thereafter bestowed to Badr ad-Din Dildirim al-Yaruqi, the Turkmen lord of nearby Tell Bashir and ally of Saladin. He continued to hold Tell Bashir well after the death of Saladin, and into the 12th century during the latter's son az-Zahir Ghazi's rule over the Emirate of Aleppo, which included Tell Bashir. By 1218, it was firmly in the possession of az-Zahir Ghazi's son and successor, al-Aziz Muhammad. There is scant information about Tell Khalid in the historical record after the Ayyubid era.

References

Bibliography

Archaeological sites in Southeastern Anatolia
Emirate of Aleppo
Tells (archaeology)
History of Gaziantep Province
Villages in Oğuzeli District